Ali Osman Ali was governor of Halabja Province in Iraq. Graduated from College of Law, University of Sulaimania, he was appointed governor of Halabja on 26 August 2016, and replaced with Azad Tofiq in an internal deal by his governing PUK political party on 24 August 2018. He is currently deputy minister of Ministry of Trade and Industry in the KRG.

Citations 

Kurdish politicians
Governors of Halabja Governorate
University of Sulaymaniyah alumni
People from Kurdistan Province
Living people
Year of birth missing (living people)